Ion Bogdan Mara (born 29 September 1977) is a Romanian former footballer.

Club career

Inter Sibiu
Born in Deva, Mara made his first steps in professional football in Sibiu, at Inter, where he played for two years. The excellent games made there caught the eyes of the big clubs of Romania.

Dinamo București
In 1998, he signed for Bucharest giants Dinamo București, one of the best Romanian clubs at the time. He played one season for the red-white squad, before going on loan to FC Farul Constanţa and Argeș Pitești.

Deportivo Alavés
Mara was the first transfer of Deportivo Alavés after the club's 4–5 loss against FC Liverpool in the UEFA Cup final. He stayed in Basque side for two seasons, but didn't scored once in 35 games. In his first year, Mara finished with Alavés on 7th position in La Liga.

Tianjin Teda
After two years in Alaves, Mara chose to leave Spain and signed for Chinese side Tianjin Teda. Sixth place in the championship was the best position Mara had with his team. After the Chinese adventure, Mara went to Polideportivo Ejido, Rapid București, Stal Alcevsk and UTA Arad, before joining Romanian squad Unirea Urziceni.

Unirea Urziceni
Mara was one of the key-players for Unirea Urziceni. In 2007–08 season, the midfielder scored 6 goals and his side finished the championship on 5th place. Next year, Mara's 5 goals in 17 games helped the little club from Urziceni win the Romanian championship.

CFR Cluj
In the winter-break of the 2008–09 season, Mara signed for CFR Cluj.
He joined CFR as a free agent, after leaving Unirea Urziceni due to the club's financial issues. He was a key part of CFR's squad at the end of the season, when the club managed to secure the second Romanian Cup in its history. CFR also secured the Romanian Supercup.

Iraklis Thessaloniki
On 15 January 2010, Iraklis Thessaloniki F.C. signed the experienced Romanian midfielder, who was a free agent after being released by CFR Cluj
In Greece, Mara played in 39 games and scored 6 goals, he also captained the team on several occasions.

Skoda Xanthi
On 31 August 2011, he signed a one-year contract with Greek side Skoda Xanthi.

International career
Mara earned 11 caps for Romania, his debut being on 2 February 2000, in a friendly 2–0 home win against Latvia. He also played against Georgia, Cyprus, Algeria twice, Ukraine, Slovakia, Lithuania, Hungary, France and Faroe Islands. Mara scored his only goal in the national team against Cyprus, in 2000.

International stats

International goals

Honours

Club
Dinamo București
Divizia A: 1999–2000
Cupa României: 1999–2000

CFR Cluj
Cupa României: 2008–09

Personal life
Bogdan Mara is engaged with Dana. On 16 August, Mara became the father of twins: a boy and a girl. "My son will be a better football player than I am", told Mara.

References

External links

1977 births
Living people
People from Deva, Romania
Romanian footballers
FC Inter Sibiu players
FC Dinamo București players
FC Rapid București players
FC Unirea Urziceni players
FC UTA Arad players
FC Argeș Pitești players
FCV Farul Constanța players
Liga I players
La Liga players
Ukrainian Premier League players
Super League Greece players
FC Stal Alchevsk players
Deportivo Alavés players
Polideportivo Ejido footballers
Tianjin Jinmen Tiger F.C. players
CFR Cluj players
Iraklis Thessaloniki F.C. players
Xanthi F.C. players
Romania international footballers
Association football midfielders
Romanian expatriate footballers
Expatriate footballers in Spain
Romanian expatriate sportspeople in Greece
Expatriate footballers in China
Expatriate footballers in Greece
Romanian expatriate sportspeople in China
Expatriate footballers in Ukraine
Romanian expatriate sportspeople in Ukraine